This is a list of windmills and windpumps in the United Kingdom.

England
The list is divided into the current ceremonial counties of England:

Bedfordshire

See List of windmills in Bedfordshire

Berkshire

Mock mill

Buckinghamshire

See List of windmills in Buckinghamshire

Cambridgeshire

See List of windmills in Cambridgeshire

Cheshire

Windmills in Cheshire, including those now within Merseyside.

Cornwall

See List of windmills in Cornwall

Cumbria

Derbyshire
See List of windmills in Derbyshire

Devon

See List of windmills in Devon.

Dorset

Maps
1710  John Hutchins

Durham

East Riding of Yorkshire

See List of windmills in the East Riding of Yorkshire

East Sussex

See List of windmills in East Sussex

Essex

See List of windmills in Essex

Gloucestershire

Greater London

See List of windmills in Greater London

Greater Manchester

Windmills that survive today within Greater Manchester. Historic windmills will be listed under Lancashire.

Hampshire

See List of windmills in Hampshire

Herefordshire

Hertfordshire

See List of windmills in Hertfordshire

Isle of Wight

See List of windmills in the Isle of Wight

Kent

See List of windmills in Kent

Lancashire

See List of windmills in Lancashire

Leicestershire

See List of windmills in Leicestershire

Lincolnshire

See List of windmills in Lincolnshire, and Lincolnshire's windmills

Merseyside
Historical mills can be found under Cheshire and Lancashire.

Mock mill

Norfolk

See List of windmills in Norfolk and List of drainage windmills in Norfolk

North Yorkshire

See List of windmills in North Yorkshire

Northamptonshire

Northumberland

Mock mill

Nottinghamshire

See List of windmills in Nottinghamshire

Oxfordshire
See List of windmills in Oxfordshire

Rutland

Shropshire

See List of windmills in Shropshire

Somerset

See List of windmills in Somerset

South Yorkshire

See List of windmills in South Yorkshire

Staffordshire

See List of windmills in Staffordshire

Suffolk

See List of windmills in Suffolk

Surrey

See List of windmills in Surrey

Tyne and Wear
Windmills standing today in Tyne and Wear, historic windmills are listed under Co Durham or Northumberland as appropriate.

Warwickshire

See List of windmills in Warwickshire

West Midlands

Windmills standing today in the West Midlands. Historical mills can be found under Staffordshire, Warwickshire and Worcestershire

Maps
1818 C & G Greenwood

West Sussex

See List of windmills in West Sussex

West Yorkshire

See List of windmills in West Yorkshire

Wiltshire

See List of windmills in Wiltshire

Worcestershire

Maps
1821 C & G Greenwood
1832 Ordnance Survey

Northern Ireland

See List of windmills in Northern Ireland

Scotland

See List of windmills in Scotland

Wales
See List of windmills in Wales

See also

Windmills in the Channel Islands
Windmills in the Isle of Man
Watermills in the United Kingdom

References

External links

Windmill World Extensive and well-researched site run by Mark Berry.

 
United Kingdom